Pocket PC 2002, originally codenamed "Merlin", was a member of the Windows Mobile family of mobile operating systems, released on October 4, 2001. Like Pocket PC 2000, it was based on Windows CE 3.0.

These Pocket PC 2002 Smartphones were mainly GSM devices. With future releases, the Pocket PC and Smartphone lines would increasingly collide as the licensing terms were relaxed allowing OEMs to take advantage of more innovative, individual design ideas.

Aesthetically, Pocket PC 2002 was meant to be similar in design to the then newly released Windows XP. Newly added or updated programs include Windows Media Player 8 with streaming capability, MSN Messenger, and Microsoft Reader 2, with digital rights management support. Upgrades to the bundled version of Office Mobile include a spell checker and word count tool in Pocket Word and improved Pocket Outlook. Connectivity was improved with file beaming on non-Microsoft devices such as Palm OS, the inclusion of Terminal Services and Virtual Private Networking support, and the ability to synchronize folders. Other upgrades include an enhanced UI with theme support and savable downloads and WAP in Pocket Internet Explorer.

On the technical side of things, Pocket PC 2002 removed MIPS and SuperH CPU support, only supporting the ARM architecture.

See also

References 

Windows CE
Windows Mobile
Discontinued versions of Microsoft Windows
Products and services discontinued in 2008